The Encyclopædia Britannica Third Edition''' (1797) is an 18-volume reference work, an edition of the Encyclopædia Britannica. It was developed during the encyclopedia's earliest period as a two-man operation initiated by Colin Macfarquhar and Andrew Bell, in Edinburgh, Scotland. Most of the editing was done by Macfarquhar, and all the copperplates were created by Bell.

History of the edition
The third edition was produced between 1788 and 1797. Colin Macfarquhar, the editor of volumes 1–12, up to "Mysteries", died in 1793, age 48, of "mental exhaustion". His heirs were bought out by Bell, who became sole owner of Britannica. Bell hired George Gleig, later Bishop Gleig of Brechin (consecrated 30 October 1808), to carry on the job as editor for the remainder of the third edition. James Thomson worked with Gleig on the editorial side. Gleig then also edited the 1801 and 1803 supplements.
The third edition was expected to occupy three hundred weekly numbers (1 shilling apiece), collected and bound in thirty parts (10 shilling, sixpence each) in fifteen volumes with 360 plates; but, by the time it was completed, it occupied 18 volumes with 14,579 pages and 542 plates. The third edition established the foundation of the Britannica as an important and definitive reference work for much of the next two centuries. With nearly double the scope of the 2nd edition, Macfarquhar's encyclopedic vision was finally realized. This edition was also very profitable, yielding £42,000 profit on the sale of about 10,000 copies. The 3rd edition began the tradition (continued to the present) of dedicating the Britannica to the reigning British monarch, then King George III; describing him as "the Father of Your People, and enlightened Patron of Arts, Sciences and Literature", Gleig wished

Like the second edition, the volumes were written over a long period, from volume 1 in 1788 to volume 18 in 1797. Unlike the second edition, the title pages were not printed with their volumes but were printed and sent to subscribers when the set was complete, and dated the year of completion. All volumes of the 3rd edition have title pages dated 1797. The encyclopedia continued to be printed, in complete sets, for many years, with all the volumes still dated 1797. In addition to the legitimate sets printed in Edinburgh, unauthorized sets were being printed in Dublin by James Moore and Philadelphia by Thomas Dobson. In Edinburgh, 10,000 complete sets were printed, according to Robert Kerr or 13,000 copies according to Constable. In addition, there were 2,000 copies of Dobsons and an unknown number by Moore. By contrast, only 1,500 copies of the second edition were printed, all unbound. The quality of the printing appears better than in previous editions.

The final page of each volume of the Encyclopædia Britannica contains "Directions" to the binder for the correct placement of the 500+ copperplates and maps. Nevertheless, some sets of the Third edition had the text and plates bound in separate volumes: the first 18 volumes containing the text, and volumes 19 and 20 all of the copperplates and maps.

In 1797, Fath Ali Shah was given a complete set of the Britannicas 3rd edition, which he read completely; after this feat, he extended his royal title to include "Most Formidable Lord and Master of the Encyclopædia Britannica".

Content and contributors

Several noted authorities contributed to this edition, such as Dr. Thomas Thomson (brother of James) who introduced the first usage of chemical symbols in the 1801 supplement (see below), and John Robison, Secretary of the Royal Society of Edinburgh, who wrote on natural philosophy.  The 3rd edition is also famous for its bold article on "Motion", which regarded Isaac Newton's theory of gravitation as erroneous. Instead, authors James Tytler and Gleig wrote that gravity is caused by the classical element of fire. They seem to have been influenced by William Jones's Essay on the First Principles of Natural Philosophy (1762), which in turn was based on John Hutchinson's MA thesis, Moses' Principia, which was written in 1724 but rejected by the University of Oxford. Nevertheless, Gleig was sanguine about the errors of the 3rd edition, repeating William Smellie's sentiment in the 1st edition quoted in the main article:

The maps in the 3rd edition are outdated, as they are the same maps that were used in the first edition of 1771 and second edition of 1784.

The preface is in vol. 1 but was dated 1797, so it apparently was sent with the title pages to bookbinders that year. It was written by Gleig, which names the authors of some of the longer articles. In it, Gleig states, "Aerology, Aerostation, Chemistry, Electricity, Gunnery, Hydrostatics, Mechanics, with most of the separate articles in the various branches of natural history, we have reason to believe were compiled by Mr. James Tytler, chemist; a man who, though his conduct has been marked by almost perpetual imprudence, possesses no common share of science and genius." Tytler's contributions stop in fact at the letter M. Tytler's very long article in the second edition on Medicine, "was revised and improved for the present by Andrew Duncan, M.D., fellow of the Royal Society of Edinburgh, and Professor of the Institutes of Physic in the University." He also states that Motion was written by himself and Tytler.

The list of authors goes on, "Mary Queen of Scots, Instinct, Love, Metaphysics, Miracle, Moral Philosophy, Oath, Passion, Plastic Nature, Polytheism, Prayer, Slavery, and Supper of the Lord were contributed by Gleig, editor of the last 6 volumes." Blind was written by Dr. Blacklock and Dr. Moyes, who were both blind. Education was written by Mr. Robert Heron; Grammar and Theology were written by Gleig and the Rev. James Bruce; Music by Dr. Blacklock; History of Art by Wm. Maxwell Morrison; Mysteries, Mythology and Philology by David Doig; Navigation, Parallax, Pendulum, Projection, Ship Building, and Naval Tactics by Andrew Mackay; and John Robison is credited with Physics, Pneumatics, Precession, Projectiles, Pumps, Resistance of fluids, Roof, Rope making, Rotation, Seamanship, Signals, Sound, Specific Gravity, Statics, Steam, Steam Engine, Strength of materials, Telescope, Tide, and Water Works. Philosophy was written by Gleig and Robison; Physiology by Dr. John Barclay; French Revolution by Gleig and Mr. Forsythe; and the articles Oxygen and Phlogiston were written by John Rotheram of St. Andrews.

There is a color plate, opposite page 208 in volume 1, named "2nd plate II" in the Aerostation article, although it was printed in B&W and colored by hand. The aerostation article describes balloon flight from 1783 to 1788, but Tytler does not mention his own balloon flights of 1784. Tytler's earlier treatise on balloon flight, written in 1784, appeared in the 200-page appendix to the second edition, in Volume 10 under "Air".

Unauthorized editions
The first American encyclopedia, Dobson's Encyclopædia, was based almost entirely on the 3rd edition of the Britannica and was published at nearly the same time (1788–1798), together with an analogous supplement (1803), by Scottish printer Thomas Dobson. Dobson, an Edinburgh native and master printer who learned his craft in that city while the first two editions were being produced there, relocated to America in 1783. The first United States copyright law was passed on 30 May 1790—although anticipated by Section 8 of Article I of the United States Constitution (ratified 4 March 1789)—but did not protect foreign publications such as the Britannica. Unlicensed copying of the Britannica in America became a problem again in the 9th edition (1889).

Illegitimate copies of the 3rd were also sold in Dublin by James Moore under the title, Moore's Dublin Edition, Encyclopædia Britannica; this was an exact reproduction. By contrast, Dobson's work had various corrections and amendments for American readers, especially in the supplement.

Supplements
After the death of Macfarquhar, Andrew Bell was sole owner of Britannica. His son-in-law Thomson Bonar set about to produce a supplement to update the encyclopedia.

Two volumes were produced in 1801 to supplement the Third edition. A second edition of the two volumes, "with improvements", was printed in 1803. Both versions were printed by John Brown, Anchor Close, Edinburgh. In both versions, the articles are ordered alphabetically and the volumes contain about 800 pages each. The 1803 edition has A-I in volume 1 and I-Z in volume 2. A new article on Chemistry, 190 pages in length, written by Thomas Thomson of Edinburgh, is meant to completely replace the 261-page article in the main encyclopedia, written by James Tytler. Much new information about oxygen, combustion, and disproof of the phlogiston theory had been discovered since Tytler's day, and are explained in the supplements. A new and quickly growing list of chemical elements and their compounds was replacing the former system, which contained only the elements earth, air, water, and fire. Thomson also wrote new articles on Mineralogy, Combustion, and a 90-page article named Substances, all pertaining to Chemistry. Thomson went on to write the article Chemistry for the 7th edition of Britannica'', 40 years later.

George Washington, who does not have his own article in the Third edition, has a 4-page article in the Supplement. John Robison of Edinburgh wrote new articles: Arch, Astronomy, Carpentry, Center, Dynamics, Electricity, Impulsion, Involution and Evolution of Curves, Machinery, Magnetism, Mechanics, Percussion, Piano-Forte, Position, Temperament, Thunder, Trumpet, and Watchwork. The French Revolution is also given a continuation, by Gleig.

The two volumes of the Supplement contain 50 copperplates, none of which were produced by Bell. Bonar retained sole ownership of the supplement's copyright. In the creation of the 4th edition of Britannica, which Bell started in 1800, none of the work from the supplements could be used, as Bell did not have the copyright, and Bonar wanted too much money for his liking. This event caused a feud between Bonar and Bell which was never resolved during Bell's lifetime. Bell died in 1809, and the 4th edition was completed the next year. Upon Bell's death, one of Britannica's major distributors, Archibald Constable, bought the encyclopedia, and also obtained Bonar's copyright by making him part owner of Britannica.

References

External links 
Complete Third Edition at Internet Archive via Online Books Page

03
1797 non-fiction books
1797 in Scotland
18th-century encyclopedias